Gjemnes Church is a parish church of the Church of Norway in Gjemnes Municipality in Møre og Romsdal county, Norway. It is located in the village of Gjemnes, along the Batnfjorden. It is the church for the Gjemnes parish which is part of the Indre Nordmøre prosti (deanery) in the Diocese of Møre. The white, wooden church was built in a long church design in 1893 by the architect Jacob Wilhelm Nordan. The church seats about 310 people.

History
The municipality and parish of Gjemnes was established in 1893, and that is also when the first church here was built. The church was designed by Jacob Wilhelm Nordan and it was one of his last since he died in 1892 and the plans he draw were not actually used until 1893 when the church was built. The wooden long church has a tower on the west end and a pair of sacristies on either side of the choir.

Media gallery

See also
List of churches in Møre

References

Gjemnes
Churches in Møre og Romsdal
Long churches in Norway
Wooden churches in Norway
19th-century Church of Norway church buildings
Churches completed in 1893
1893 establishments in Norway